Savitri Nigam (1919-1985) was an Indian politician. She was a Member of Parliament, representing Uttar Pradesh in the Rajya Sabha the upper house of India's Parliament and to the Lok Sabha, lower house of the Parliament of India from Banda, Uttar Pradesh as a member of the Indian National Congress.

References

External links
Official biographical sketch in Parliament of India website

Rajya Sabha members from Uttar Pradesh
Indian National Congress politicians
India MPs 1962–1967
Lok Sabha members from Uttar Pradesh
1919 births
1985 deaths
Women members of the Lok Sabha
Women members of the Rajya Sabha
People from Banda district, India